Chanda Villanueva Romero (born February 26, 1954) is a Filipina actress. She is mostly seen on GMA Network.

She played supporting roles and leading roles in many films during the early and late 1970s.  Her prolific work in sexy comedies and dramas caught the attention of many directors, and in the 1980s, showed her serious work as an actress in the Ishmael Bernal's Working Girls and Dapat Ka Bang Mahalin?, both in 1984. She showed a different side in what may be considered as her most underrated work in Kapag Tumabang ang Asin with Daria Ramirez, and Pag-ibig na Walang Dangal with Dindo Fernando and Charo Santos.

Biography
Chanda Romero is the daughter of Enrique Romero, son of Francisco Romero Jr. and Gloria Villanueva of Negros Oriental, and Remedios Valenzuela, daughter of Ramiro Valenzuela and Josefina de la Victoria of Cebu.

Her father Enrique, also known as Bobby, was the paternal grandson of Francisco Romero Sr., mayor of Tanjay, Negros Oriental from 1909 to 1916 and later a member of the Provincial Board of Negros Oriental, and Josefa Calumpang Muñoz, daughter of Tanjay gobernadorcillo Don José Teves Muñoz and Doña Aleja Ines Calumpang, a great-granddaughter of Don Fernando Velaz de Medrano Bracamonte y Dávila (es), Marquis of Tabuérniga de Velazar (es), 15th Marquis of Cañete (GE) (es), 6th Marquis of Fuente el Sol (es), 8th Marquis of Navamorcuende (es), 15th Lord of Montalbo, and Knight of the Order of St. John. Her father was also the maternal grandson of Enrique Cayetano Teves Villanueva Sr., governor of Negros Oriental from 1916-1925 and later representative of the 2nd district of Negros Oriental from 1925 to 1931, and Francisca Gomez Baena, Negros Oriental Carnival Queen in 1909.

Other relations include her mother's sister Milagros Valenzuela-Urgello, Cebu Carnival Queen in 1937; her grandfather's brother José E. Romero, the first Philippine ambassador to the Court of St. James's and later Secretary of Education; Eddie S. Romero, National Artist for Film; Jose V. Romero Jr., former Philippine ambassador to Italy; Hector R.R. Villanueva, Press Secretary of Philippine President Fidel Ramos and later Postmaster General of the Philippines during the Arroyo administration; among others.

Career
In the 1970s and the 1980s, she had a staple of films in which she starred with award-winning actresses such as Elizabeth Oropesa, Hilda Koronel, Gloria Diaz and Daria Ramirez.  As a result, she caught the attention of directors Celso Ad Castillo, Ishmael Bernal, Danny Zialcita and Lino Brocka.  Her leading men include Philip Salvador, Eddie Garcia, Christopher de Leon, Dindo Fernando, Joel Torre, etc. In the 1990s, her work in television also brought her success.  Shows such as Villa Quintana.  She was also praised for her role in the 1997 movie Ligaya Ang Itawag Mo Sa Akin which was directed by Carlos Siguion-Reyna. Romero is a freelancer but does more projects in GMA Network. She has starred in ABS-CBN projects as well like the religious-centered drama series Kapalaran and the role of Vida Mojica in the Vietnamese-Filipino teleserye starring Maricel Soriano and John Estrada, Vietnam Rose. During 2012, she transferred to TV5 for the first time and became part of Kidlat as Minerva Megaton. As of 2013, Romero is with GMA-7.

Personal life
She married Jose Mari "Mayi" Alejandrino on October 25, 2013. On May 17, 2014, Chanda and Mayi professed their vows in a commitment ceremony at the Tierra de Maria Chapel in Tagaytay.

Her mother died on July 6, 2020 as one of the casualties of COVID-19 in Cebu City.

Filmography

Film

Television

Awards and nominations

References

1954 births
Living people
GMA Network personalities
20th-century Filipino actresses
21st-century Cebuano actresses
Filipino people of Indian descent
Cebuano women comedians
Cebuano film actresses
Cebuano television actresses
Filipino television presenters
Filipino people of Spanish descent
People from Cagayan de Oro
Actresses from Misamis Oriental
Actresses from Negros Oriental
Visayan people
Filipino women television presenters